Skull Creek is a historic archeological site located at Hilton Head Island, Beaufort County, South Carolina. The site includes two of 20 or more prehistoric Indian shell middens in a ring shape located from the central coast of South Carolina to the central coast of Georgia. It probably dates from early in the second millennium BC, and is likely to contain some of the earliest pottery known in North America.  The Skull Creek rings are the only known example of a later ring superimposed over an earlier one.

It was listed in the National Register of Historic Places in 1970.

References

Archaeological sites on the National Register of Historic Places in South Carolina
Buildings and structures in Beaufort County, South Carolina
National Register of Historic Places in Beaufort County, South Carolina
Shell rings